The 1945 Irish presidential election was held on Thursday, 14 June 1945. It was Ireland's first contested presidential election. Outgoing president Douglas Hyde, who had served since 1938, decided not to seek a second term. Fianna Fáil nominated its deputy leader, Tánaiste Seán T. O'Kelly, as its candidate. Fine Gael nominated Seán Mac Eoin. Independent republican Patrick McCartan sought and failed to receive the necessary four nominations from local councils, but secured a nomination from Oireachtas members.

O'Kelly won on the second count but the degree of voting transfers between the two opposition candidates, and O'Kelly's failure to win on the first count, showed the depth of growing opposition to Éamon de Valera's government and the potential that existed for cooperation among various opposition groups. De Valera's government was defeated in the subsequent 1948 general election and replaced by a First Inter-Party Government.

The election took place on the same date as the 1945 local elections. Electoral law was amended to allow administrative counties and county boroughs to be used as constituencies instead of using Dáil constituencies, as previously required. This was to facilitate sorting and counting of ballots with ballots for the local elections.

Nomination process
Under Article 12 of the Constitution of Ireland, candidates could be nominated by:
at least twenty of the 198 serving members of the Houses of the Oireachtas, or
at least four of 31 councils of the administrative counties, including county boroughs, or
themselves, in the case of a former or retiring president.

All Irish citizens on the Dáil electoral register were eligible to vote.

The first candidate nominated was Seán Mac Eoin, a Fine Gael TD who was nominated on 5 May by 17 members of his own party, as well as three independent TDs, Alfie Byrne, Tom O'Reilly and Richard Anthony. Seán T. O'Kelly was nominated by Fianna Fáil Oireachtas members on 15 May. On the date before nominations closed on 16 May, the administrative council of the Labour Party voted to allow its Oireachtas members to sign the nomination form of Patrick McCartan, and Clann na Talmhan voted that its Oireachtas members would sign his nomination form, together guaranteeing his position on the ballot.

Result

Results by local authority
Results were announced by county councils and county borough corporations rather than by constituency.

References

1945 elections in the Republic of Ireland
Presidential election
Presidential elections in Ireland
June 1945 events in Europe